Yuri y Mijares:Juntos por Primera Vez (English Yuri and Mijares: Together for the very first time) a compilation album by Mexican pop singers Mijares and Yuri.

Track listing
Tracks:
 Yo te pido amor – Yuri
 Para amarnos más – Mijares
 Maldita primavera – Yuri
 Bella – Mijares
 Es ella más que yo – Yuri
 Poco a poco – Mijares
 Cuando baja la marea – Yuri
 Siempre – Mijares
 Yo te amo, te amo – Yuri
 No se murió el amor – Mijares
 Un corazón herido – Yuri
 Que nada nos separe – Mijares
 Primer amor – Yuri
 Me acordaré de ti – Mijares
 Esperanzas – Yuri
 Encadenado – Mijares

Originals albums
Those songs were taken from different albums of these artists. Here is the list:

From Yuri's albums
 Yo te pido amor → track 1
 Llena de dulzura → track 3
 Un corazón herido → tracks 5 & 11
 Aire → track 7
 Yuri: Sí, soy así → track 9
 Esperanzas → tracks 13 & 15

From Mijares' albums
 Un Hombre Discreto → tracks 2 & 14
 Manuel Mijares → tracks 4 & 8
 Amor y Rock And Roll → tracks 6 & 10
 Que Nada Nos Separe → track 12
 Encadenado → track 16

Manuel Mijares compilation albums
Yuri (Mexican singer) albums
Split albums
2003 compilation albums